Tihomil Drezga (Dresga, Drezza) (December 10, 1903– August 1981) was a Croatian chess master.

He was born in Šibenik, Croatia, and graduated from a gymnasium in Split. Then he studied international law at the Sorbonne in Paris and received a doctorate of law.

In 1927/28, he won in the Lites Chess Club in Paris, followed by Josef Cukierman, Vitaly Halberstadt, Victor Kahn, etc.; won two games for French team in 2nd Chess Olympiad at The Hague 1928; tied for 6-7th in the 4th Paris City Chess Championship 1928 (Abraham Baratz won), and won, ahead of Eugene Znosko-Borovsky, in the 5th Paris-ch 1929.

After spending some years in France, Drezga returned to Yugoslavia. He took 2nd at Zagreb 1934, took 9th at Maribor 1934 (Vasja Pirc and Lajos Steiner won), and took 2nd, behind Petar Trifunović, at Zagreb 1935.

During World War II, he was a professor at the Faculty of Law in Zagreb from 1943 to 1945. After the war, he illegally emigrated to Italy in 1947, and then to the United States.  He died in Erie, Pennsylvania.

References

External links

1903 births
1981 deaths
Yugoslav chess players
Chess Olympiad competitors
Yugoslav emigrants to the United States
University of Paris alumni
Yugoslav expatriates in France
20th-century chess players